"We're Not from Here" is the second episode in the third season of the television series How I Met Your Mother and 46th overall. It originally aired on October 1, 2007 and was directed by Pamela Fryman.

Plot 
Lily and Marshall explain they are each putting together their 'death folders' containing useful information should either of them die, which includes a letter to the other, but Marshall tells Ted and Barney that he forgot to write his letter. Ted and Barney play on Marshall's superstitious nature by insisting he will not die before writing it, forcing Marshall to knock on wood, throw salt over his left shoulder, and spin around three times before leaving.

Future Ted narrates that Robin needed time away following their break-up and we see her on vacation with Gael, saying she felt up-tight in New York. Back in the bar she claims to be a different person, but Barney says Robin is still the same, adding that she will realize this and dump Gael soon. When Gael joins them, the gang use formal language in order to continue their conversation without letting on, which makes Gael ask if they are talking about baseball.

Marshall writes his letter to Lily, pouring his heart (and tears) out over many pages. Once finished, he decides to read Lily's letter to him and is angry to discover it is not as heart-felt as his, instead containing information on her teacher's pension and a reminder to cancel Vogue.

At the bar, Gael is surrounded by women while Ted and Barney lament how easy it is for Gael to get women simply by being from out of town. This gives them the idea to pose as tourists outside MacLaren's and they strike up a conversation with two passing women, Colleen and Lindsay. The women agree to show them around town the following day and Barney suggests they meet outside MacLaren's, but Colleen and Lindsay say it's a lame bar. Ted tries to defend his favorite watering hole without revealing he is a New Yorker.

Inside, Lily asks Robin how things are going with Gael and Robin reveals she has become annoyed with things at home that she loved on vacation, such as being hand-fed her food by Gael (dropping spaghetti on her sofa) and him sweeping the table clear to make love to her (breaking her laptop). Robin says she won't complain and wants to go with the flow. However, when she is in the shower later, someone uses her toilet and, initially thinking it is Gael, she is shocked to discover it is actually a strange Australian backpacker (Damon Gameau). Robin goes to speak to Gael, but discovers he has invited the backpacker and his friends to stay with them indefinitely.

Marshall starts an argument with Lily over her loveless letter. They exchange a quick hug after Lily mentions this is their first fight as a married couple before Marshall continues to storm out.

Colleen and Lindsay take Ted and Barney to a potato restaurant. When the women go to the bathroom, Ted says they have met the "two lamest New Yorkers of all time," but Barney convinces Ted to continue with the plan and the women decide to take Ted and Barney to a friend's party.

Robin reveals she ate a marijuana-laced blueberry muffin that one of the backpackers had baked, causing her to say some inappropriate things on the air at her news anchor job. She tries to lay some ground-rules but the group is watching television, so Robin decides to lie down as she is still "pretty baked."

Ted, Barney, Colleen and Lindsay are in a cab on their way to the party. Ted questions where they are going and is terrified to learn they are heading for the South Bronx. His fears are confirmed as they end up giving descriptions to the police of three guys who have apparently mugged them.

Marshall quizzes Lily over why she couldn't write a love letter like he did and Lily states it is because she cannot bear to think about not being with him, and that he would just open the letter and read it as soon as she has finished writing anyway. Marshall promises he won't, so Lily agrees to write her letter, but Marshall asks her to make the letter "dirty" and slip in some Polaroids.

Back on the street, Ted and Barney are invited back to Colleen and Lindsay's place but Ted finally snaps when he finds out that they are actually from New Jersey. Ted chastises the women about not being from New York and derides New Jersey due to his deep seated hatred for the state. He tells them to go home, which they do by getting a ride from the police officers that interviewed them. Ted and Barney try to get the same courtesy, but the police officer refuses by stating he is from "Newark, born and raised."

Robin is woken by the sound of bongo drums and confronts 'vacation Robin' in the living room who tells her that she has lost her way since coming home. Robin retorts by saying that her vacation self is boring, lame, and getting sand everywhere. As the two are about to kiss, Robin is really woken by drums and finds the group of travelers playing in the living room. She finally gets rid of them by brandishing her gun, but the shouting wakes Gael and Robin tells him they have to break up. Barney toasts the return of the real Robin while she mentions that 'vacation Robin' popped up in her dreams again and that "that chick knows what I like."

Lily finishes her letter and makes Marshall swear not to read it until she is dead. Future Ted narrates that he kept his promise until November 2029 when an older, balding Marshall opens the letter (implying that Lily has died) to find Lily's words telling him he is busted for reading it too soon. Marshall calls Lily, older and very much alive, into his office and they argue. Marshall says Lily also broke her promise as there are no naked pictures in the envelope for him; Lily says she will take some photos – but Marshall doesn't want them anymore, which offends Lily and sparks an argument.

Critical response 

 Donna Bowman of The A.V. Club rated the episode C.
 Staci Krause of IGN gave the episode 5.9 out of 10. This episode received the lowest rating from IGN from all of season 3.

References

External links 
 

How I Met Your Mother (season 3) episodes
2007 American television episodes